Lar Dam (Persian: سد لار sad-de lār) is a dam located at the foot of Mount Damavand in Amol county, Mazandaran, Iran. The dam is located within the protected Lar National Park and situated just 70 kilometers northeast of the capital and the most populous city of the country, Tehran. The primary purpose of the dam is municipal water supply to Tehran but prior to the water reaching the city filtration plant, it is used to power the Kalan and Lavarak Hydroelectric Power Stations, with a combined installed capacity of 162.5 MW.

Construction

The construction began on the dam in 1974, and ended four years later in 1981. When the reservoir began in 1980, leakage was discovered downstream. The leakage is due to a karst foundation. The foundation was grouted from 1983 until 1989 with no success. With the population growth occurring in Amol, there was a need for more water and energy. The ideal place for the dam was over the Lar river, in the northeast section of the city, at the elevated heights of the Kalanbasteh mountain on the slope of Mount Damavand. The area is called Polour, and operations began in 1984.

One of the aims for building the Lar dam was to supply part of Amol with drinking water; it was not possible initially to operate the dam at its nominal capacity, because of a water seepage problem. Water stored in the dam's reservoir is first transferred to the Kalan Power Station then to the Lavark Power Station, a distance of 3 kilometers from the Latyan Dam's reservoir, through the 20 kilometer long Kalan tunnel (3 meters in size). After electricity generation, the water joins and feeds the Latyan dam's reservoir. The Kalan Power Station was commissioned in 1998 and the Lavarak in March 2012 and July 2013.

Uncontrolled growth and expansion of Tehran created a situation where the existing water resources at Karaj, Latyan and Lar dams and the deep wells which were supposed to be exploited only in the during the peak water consumption period. These were no longer capable of meeting the city's water demand, so inevitable abstraction from ground resources started to increase in a manner that at the present situation, the quantity of drilled deep wells has amounted to 230 rings. In fact, from 1997-2000, it had been orderly abstracted, 317, 289, 374 and 357 MCM (million cubic metres) of water from groundwater resources of the city.

Lake
The lake is 84 km northeast of Tehran, and due to its proximity to Mount Damavand it creates a cool and pleasant climate as well as beautiful landscapes. The lake provides the scope for water sports such as swimming and waterskiing.

References

External links

 Soil-water.com: Profile of Lar Dam
 FAO: Report on Lar Dam
 Ingenierie.fr: Lar Dam Project—

Dams in Mazandaran Province
Buildings and structures in Mazandaran Province
Hydroelectric power stations in Iran
Alborz (mountain range)
Amol County
Dams completed in 1982
Energy infrastructure completed in 1998
1982 establishments in Iran
Tourist attractions in Amol
Tourist attractions in Mazandaran Province